Charles Gerard Carter (born 19 January 1971) is an Irish former hurler who played as a corner-forward at senior level for the Kilkenny county team.

Born in Gowran, County Kilkenny, Carter first played competitive hurling whilst at school at St Kieran's College. He arrived on the inter-county scene at the age of seventeen when he first linked up with the Kilkenny minor team, before later joining the under-21 and junior sides. He made his senior debut during the 1990-91 National League. Carter went on to play a key role for Kilkenny, and won two All-Ireland medals, four Leinster medals and one National Hurling League medal. He was an All-Ireland runner-up on two occasions.

As a member of the Leinster inter-provincial team on a number of occasions, Carter won one Railway Cup medal. At club level he is a two-time championship medallist with Young Irelands.

Throughout his career Carter made 29 championship appearances. He retired from inter-county hurling in controversial circumstances on 7 June 2003.

Career statistics

References

1971 births
Living people
Young Irelands (Kilkenny) hurlers
Kilkenny inter-county hurlers
Leinster inter-provincial hurlers
All-Ireland Senior Hurling Championship winners
Irish farmers